Leucophlebia paul is a moth of the family Sphingidae. It is known from Tanzania.

References

Leucophlebia
Moths described in 2003